Giorgio Albertazzi (20 August 1923 – 28 May 2016)  was an Italian actor and film director.

Born in San Martino a Mensola, Tuscany, Albertazzi joined the Italian Social Republic and reached the rank of lieutenant. After their defeat, he spent two years in prison for collaborating. Following the amnesty by Palmiro Togliatti he changed from studying architecture to acting.

In the theater Albertazzi debuted in Shakespeare's Troilus and Cressida, and over the following decades starred in a number of classics, many of them for television. From the early 1950s he was also seen on the big screen and appeared in more than 50 films. From 1969, he directed several television films, including the miniseries George Sand in 1981. From 2003, he was the director of the Teatro di Roma.

He had a close friendship with actress Anna Proclemer who appeared with him for many years. In 2007, Albertazzi married his long-standing partner, Pia de Tolomei.

In 1988 he wrote his memoirs.

Filmography

Discography

Album 
 1961 – D'Annunzio – Brani scelti da la figlia di Jorio (La voce del padrone, QELP 8045, LP) with Anna Proclemer
 1963 – Eliot – La terra desolata (Stereoletteraria, SPM 103, LP)
 1974 – La solitudine (Cetra, LP) with Vittorio Gassman
 Dante – Inferno (Sansoni Accademia Editori, SLI 03, LP) with Tino Buzzelli, Tino Carraro, Ottavio Fanfani, Davide Montemurri
 Dante – La divina commedia – Paradiso (Nuova Accademia Del Disco, BLI 2005, LP) with Ernesto Calindri, Tino Carraro, Anna Proclemer, Ottavio Fanfani
 Eluard (LP) with Gérard Philipe
  Leopardi – Canti (Cetra, CLC 0829, LP) with Arnoldo Foà, Vittorio Gassman, Alberto Lupo
 Neruda – 20 poesie d'amore e una canzone disperata (SPM 101, LP)
 Pasternak – Poesie (SPM 102, LP)

Singles 

 1955 – Petrarca (Cetra – Collana Letteraria Documento, CL 0418, EP 7")
 1957 – Solitudine (Cetra – Collana Letteraria Documento, CL 0434, EP 7")
 1961 – Lettere d'amore (Cetra – Collana Letteraria Documento, CL 0477, EP 7")
 1965 – Discorso della montagna (Cetra – Collana Letteraria Documento, CL 0419, EP 7")
 1969 – Questa cosa che chiamiamo mondo/Tema di Linda (Carosello, CL 20222, 7") from the television series Jekyll
 1969 – Ti amo... ed io di più/Sospendi il tempo (Boradway International, 7") with Anna Proclemer
 1970 – Miraggio d'estate/Miraggio d'estate (Carosello,  7") with Penny Brown
 I fioretti di S. Francesco (Istituto Internazionale Del Disco, SIL 4001, EP 7") with Antonio Baldini
 Giorgio Sacchetti – Tre novelle lette da Giorgio Albertazzi (Istituto Internazionale Del Disco, SIL 4096, EP 7")
 Neruda, Barcarola e altre poesie (Nuova Accademia Disco, DP 6008, EP)

Awards
 : Knight Grand Cross of the Order of Merit of the Italian Republic (26 june 1996)
Benemeriti della cultura e dell'arte (2003)

References

External links

1923 births
2016 deaths
Italian male actors
Italian film directors
Centro Sperimentale di Cinematografia alumni
Italian military personnel of World War II
Knights Grand Cross of the Order of Merit of the Italian Republic
People from Fiesole